The epicenter, epicentre or epicentrum in seismology is the point on the Earth's surface directly above a hypocenter or focus, the point where an earthquake or an underground explosion originates.

Surface damage
Before the instrumental period of earthquake observation, the epicenter was thought to be the location where the greatest damage occurred, but the subsurface fault rupture may be long and spread surface damage across the entire rupture zone.

Epicentral distance 
During an earthquake, seismic waves propagate in all directions from the hypocenter. Seismic shadowing occurs on the opposite side of the Earth from the earthquake epicenter because the planet's liquid outer core refracts the longitudinal or compressional (P-waves) while it absorbs the transverse or shear waves (S-waves).  Outside the seismic shadow zone, both types of wave can be detected but, because of their different velocities and paths through the Earth, they arrive at different times.  By measuring the time difference on any seismograph and the distance on a travel-time graph on which the P-wave and S-wave have the same separation, geologists can calculate the distance to the quake's epicenter.  This distance is called the epicentral distance, commonly measured in ° (degrees) and denoted as Δ (delta) in seismology. The Láska's empirical rule provides an approximation of epicentral distance in the range of 2 000 − 10 000 km.  

Once distances from the epicenter have been calculated from at least three seismographic measuring stations, the point can be located, using trilateration.

Epicentral distance is also used in calculating seismic magnitudes as developed by Richter and Gutenberg.

Fault rupture 

The point at which fault slipping begins is referred to as the focus of the earthquake. The fault rupture begins at the focus and then expands along the fault surface. The rupture stops where the stresses become insufficient to continue breaking the fault (because the rocks are stronger) or where the rupture enters ductile material. The magnitude of an earthquake is related to the total area of its fault rupture. Most earthquakes are small, with rupture dimensions less than the depth of the focus so the rupture doesn't break the surface, but in high magnitude, destructive earthquakes, surface breaks are common. When a fault ruptures unilaterally (with the epicenter at or near the end of the fault break) the waves are stronger in one direction along the fault.

Macroseismic epicenter 
The macroseismic epicenter is the best estimate of the location of the epicenter derived without instrumental data. This may be estimated using intensity data, information about foreshocks and aftershocks, knowledge of local fault systems or extrapolations from data regarding similar earthquakes. For historical earthquakes that have not been instrumentally recorded, only a macroseismic epicenter can be given.

Derivation and usage

The word is derived from the New Latin noun epicentrum, the latinisation of the ancient Greek adjective ἐπίκεντρος, "occupying a cardinal point, situated on a centre", from ἐπί (epi) "on, upon, at" and κέντρον (kentron) "centre". The term was coined by the Irish seismologist Robert Mallet.

It is also used to mean "center of activity", as in "Travel is restricted in the Chinese province thought to be the epicentre of the SARS outbreak." Garner's Modern American Usage gives several examples of use in which "epicenter" is used to mean "center". Garner also refers to a William Safire article in which Safire quotes a geophysicist as attributing the use of the term to "spurious erudition on the part of writers combined with scientific illiteracy on the part of copy editors". Garner has speculated that these misuses may just be "metaphorical descriptions of focal points of unstable and potentially destructive environments."

References 

Seismology
Geometric centers